Cabalist or Cabalistic may refer to:
Cabal, a group of people united in some close design together, usually to promote their private views or interests in a church, state, or other community
Christian Kabbalah, an incorporation of Jewish Kabbalah into Christian theology from the Renaissance onwards
Hermetic Qabalah, a Western esoteric tradition involving mysticism and the occult
English Qabalah, several different systems of mysticism related to Hermetic Qabalah that interpret the letters of the Roman script or English alphabet via their numerological significance
English Qaballa, an English esoteric tradition involving mysticism and the occult
Kabbalah, an esoteric method, discipline and school of thought in Jewish mysticism
Lurianic Kabbalah, a school of Kabbalah named after Isaac Luria
Practical Kabbalah, a branch of the Jewish mystical tradition that concerns the use of magic
Prophetic Kabbalah, Abraham Abulafia's system of meditative Kabbalah in Judaism

See also
Cabala (disambiguation)